Plastic Surgery Disasters is the second full-length album released by punk rock band Dead Kennedys. Recorded in San Francisco during June 1982, it was produced by the band and  punk record producer Thom Wilson, with Geza X getting a "special thanks" underneath the DK's/Wilson credit for additional production. (DK's guitarist East Bay Ray redundantly added his own name to the production credits on Manifesto reissues of the album.) The album is darker and more hardcore-influenced than their debut album Fresh Fruit for Rotting Vegetables as a result of the band trying to expand on the sound and mood they had achieved with their 1980 single "Holiday in Cambodia". It was the first full-length album to feature drummer D.H. Peligro, and is frontman Jello Biafra's favorite Dead Kennedys album.

According to Jello Biafra, the main musical influences for the album were Bauhaus, Les Baxter and The Groundhogs.

Artwork

The album's cover features the band's name superimposed over the black-and-white photograph "Hands" by photojournalist Michael Wells. Wells's photo depicts the emaciated forearm and hand of a malnourished Ugandan child in the palm of a European missionary to highlight the horrors of famine in parts of the African continent during the 1970s and 80s. The same image was used by another San Francisco-based punk band called Society Dog for their 1981 EP .....Off of the Leash..

Most pressings of the album include a booklet containing lyrics and pieces of collage artwork by Biafra and Winston Smith that thematically tie in to the lyrics of each song on the album.

Track listings

On the album's original vinyl and cassette releases, the A-side comprises tracks 1–8, ending with “Winnebago Warrior”, and the B-side tracks 9–13, kicking off with “Riot”. Some reissues parse out Melissa Webber's spoken intro to the album from the opening song, "Government Flu", and list it as a separate track entitled "Advice from Christmas Past". Similarly, Webber's spoken outro after "Moon Over Marin" revisits "Advice from Christmas Past" and is listed as such on some editions of the album.

The compact disc of the album has been reissued to include the EP In God We Trust, Inc. as eight tracks added onto its end and also appear on streaming versions of Plastic Surgery Disasters.

Personnel
Dead Kennedys
 Jello Biafra – lead vocals
 East Bay Ray – guitar
 Klaus Flouride – bass, backing vocals, clarinet on "Terminal Preppie"
 D. H. Peligro – drums
with:
 Dave Barrett – saxophone on "Terminal Preppie"
 Bruce Askley – saxophone on "Terminal Preppie"
 Melissa Webber – backing vocals (credited as "The Voice of Christmas Past")
 Ninotchka (Therese Soder) – backing vocals on "Forest Fire" and "Winnebago Warrior"
Production
 Thom Wilson; East Bay Ray – producers
 John Cuniberti and Oliver Dicicco;– engineer
 John Cuniberti;– mixer
 Winston Smith; Jello Biafra – artwork

Charts

Certifications

References

1982 albums
Alternative Tentacles albums
Dead Kennedys albums
Albums produced by Thom Wilson
Faulty Products albums